Opposition to World War I included  socialist, anarchist, syndicalist, and Marxist groups on the left, as well as  Christian pacifists, Canadian and Irish nationalists, women's groups, intellectuals, and rural folk.

The socialist movements had declared before the war their opposition to a war which they said could only mean workers killing each other in the interests of their bosses. Once the war was declared, most socialist and most of the trade union decided to back the government of their country and support the war. For example, on July 25, 1914 the executive of the Social Democratic Party of Germany (SPD) issued an appeal to its membership to demonstrate against the coming war, only to vote on August 4 for the war credits the German government wanted. Likewise the French Socialist Party and its union, the CGT, especially after the assassination of the pacificist Jean Jaurès, organized mass rallies and protests until the outbreak of war, but once the war began they argued that in wartime socialists should support their nations against the aggression of other nations and also voted for war credits.

Groups opposed to the war included the Russian Bolsheviks, the Socialist Party of America, the Italian Socialist Party, and the socialist faction led by Karl Liebknecht and Rosa Luxemburg in Germany (later to become the Communist Party of Germany). In Sweden, the socialist youth leader Zeth Höglund was jailed for his anti-war propaganda, even though Sweden did not participate in the war.

Women
Women across the spectrum were much less supportive of the war than men. Women in church groups were especially anti-war.  However, women in the suffrage movement in different countries wanted to support the war effort, asking for the vote as a reward for that support.

In France, women activists from both the working-class socialist women's and the middle-class suffrage movements formed their own groups to oppose the war. However, they were unable to coordinate their efforts because of mutual suspicion due to class and political differences. After 1915 the groups weakened and dissolved entirely as their leading militants left to work within nonfeminist organizations opposing the war.

The women's suffrage movement in Britain split on the war issue. The main official groups supported the war but it was opposed by a number of prominent women's rights campaigners, including Helena Swanwick, Margaret Ashton, Catherine Marshall, Maude Royden, Kathleen Courtney  Chrystal Macmillan, and Sylvia Pankhurst. It was an early coalition of women's campaigning with pacifism that led to the formation of Women's International League for Peace and Freedom in 1915.

Pacifists

Although the onset of the First World War was generally greeted with enthusiastic patriotism across Europe, peace groups were still active in protesting the starting of the war. In Britain, the prominent peace activist Stephen Henry Hobhouse went to prison for refusing military service, citing his convictions as an "International Socialist and, a Christian" Many socialist groups and movements were antimilitarist, arguing that war by its nature was a type of governmental coercion of the working class for the benefit of capitalist elites. The French socialist pacifist leader Jean Jaurès was assassinated by a nationalist fanatic on July 31, 1914.  The national parties in the Second International increasingly supported their respective nations in war and the International was dissolved in 1916.

In 1915 the League of Nations Society was formed by British Liberal Party leaders to promote a strong international organization that could enforce the peaceful resolution of conflict. Later that year the League to Enforce Peace was established in America to promote similar goals. Hamilton Holt published an editorial in his New York City weekly magazine the Independent called "The Way to Disarm: A Practical Proposal" on September 28, 1914. It called for an international organization to agree upon the arbitration of disputes and to guarantee the territorial integrity of its members by maintaining military forces sufficient to defeat those of any non-member. The ensuing debate among prominent internationalists modified Holt's plan to align it more closely with proposals offered in Great Britain by Viscount James Bryce, a former ambassador from Britain to the U.S. These and other initiatives were pivotal in the change in attitudes that gave birth to the League of Nations after the war.

Christian pacifists and the traditional peace churches such as the Religious Society of Friends (Quakers) opposed the war. Most American Pentecostal denominations were critical to the war and encouraged their members to be conscientious objectors.

In the United States, some of the many groups that protested against the war were the Woman's Peace Party (which was organized in 1915 and led by noted reformer Jane Addams), the American Union Against Militarism, the Fellowship of Reconciliation, and the American Friends Service Committee. Jeannette Rankin, the first woman elected to Congress, was another fierce advocate of pacifism, the only person to vote no to America's entrance into both World Wars.

Great Britain
In Britain, some people resisted conscription. By 1918 several distinguished people were imprisoned for their opposition to it, including "the nation's leading investigative journalist, a future winner of the Nobel Prize, more than half a dozen future members of Parliament, one future cabinet minister, and a former newspaper editor who was publishing a clandestine journal for his fellow inmates." One of them was Bertrand Russell - a mathematician, philosopher and social critic engaged in pacifist activities, who was dismissed from Trinity College, Cambridge, following his conviction under the Defence of the Realm Act in 1916. A later conviction resulted in six months' of imprisonment in Brixton Prison from which he was released in September 1918.

Despite the mainstream Labour Party's support for the war effort, the Independent Labour Party was instrumental in opposing conscription through organizations such as the Non-Conscription Fellowship, while a Labour Party affiliate, the British Socialist Party, organized a number of unofficial strikes. Arthur Henderson resigned from the Cabinet in 1917 amid calls for party unity to be replaced by George Barnes. Overall, the majority of the movement continued to support the war for the duration of the conflict, and the British Labour Party, unlike most of its equivalents on the Continent, did not split over the war.

In the shipyards in and around Glasgow, Scotland, opposition to the British war effort became a major aim during the Red Clydeside era. To mobilize the workers of Clydeside against World War I, the Clyde Workers' Committee (CWC) was formed, with Willie Gallacher as its head and David Kirkwood its treasurer.  The CWC led the campaign against the coalitiom government in which David Lloyd George was a prominent member, and their Munitions Act, which forbade engineers from leaving the company they were employed in. The CWC negotiated with government leaders, but no agreement could be reached and consequently both Gallacher and Kirkwood were arrested and imprisoned under the Defence of the Realm Act.

Anti-war activity also took place outside the workplace and on the streets in general. The Marxist John Maclean and Independent Labour Party member James Maxton were both jailed for their anti-war propagandizing.

In the British Empire

Australia
In Australia two referendums in 1916 and 1917 resulted in votes against conscription, and were seen as opposition to an all-out prosecution of the war. In retaliation, the Australian government used the War Precautions Act and the Unlawful Associations Act to arrest and prosecute anti-conscriptionists such as Tom Barker, editor of Direct Action and many other members of the Industrial Workers of the World. The young John Curtin, at the time a member of the Victorian Socialist Party, was also arrested. Anti-conscriptionist publications were seized by government censors in police raids.

Other notable opponents to Conscription included the Catholic Archbishop of Melbourne Daniel Mannix, the Queensland Labor Premier Thomas Ryan, Vida Goldstein and the Women's Peace Army. Most labor unions actively opposed conscription.

Many Australians thought positively of conscription as a sign of loyalty to Britain and thought that it would also support those men who were already fighting. However, trade unions feared that their members might be replaced by cheaper foreign or female labour and opposed conscription. Some groups argued that the whole war was immoral, and it was unjust to force people to fight.

In Australia, women had full rights to vote which was then rare.

Canada
In Canada opposition to conscription and involvement in the war centered on French Canadian nationalists led by Henri Bourassa. Following the 1917 elections, the government implemented the Military Service Act 1917 that came into effect in 1918, which sparked a weekend of rioting in Quebec City between March 28 and April 1, 1918. Invoking the War Measures Act of 1914, the federal government sent troops to restore order in the city, which opened fire on a demonstration on April 1.

Ireland
Beginning in 1914, anti-war campaigns in Ireland were led by the pacifist Francis Sheehy-Skeffington and the Socialist James Connolly, and by Laurence Ginnell in the British House of Commons. Both Connolly and Sheehy-Skeffington, however, were executed by the British Army following the Easter Rising of 1916. The Conscription Crisis of 1918 had long-term repercussions, uniting several nationalist parties and the Roman Catholic Hierarchy in opposition to the draft. This played a major part in the Irish War of Independence and the creation of the Irish Free State in 1922.

New Zealand
In New Zealand, the war (particularly conscription) was opposed by the New Zealand Socialist Party and its successor the New Zealand Labour Party. Several members were prosecuted for sedition in 1916 and imprisoned, including Peter Fraser, Bob Semple and Paddy Webb. Fraser was later Prime Minister of New Zealand for most of World War II.

In other Allied European countries

Russia
In Russia, opposition to the war was originally led by both Marxists and pacifist Tolstoyans under the leadership of Valentin Bulgakov. Bulgakov's first reaction to the outbreak of war was the appeal "Wake up, all people are brothers!" which he composed on September 28, 1914.

"Our enemies are - not the Germans, and - not Russians or Frenchmen. The common enemy of us all, no matter what nationality to which we belong - is the beast within us. Nowhere is this truth so clearly confirmed, as now, when, intoxicated, and excessively proud of their false science, their foreign culture and their civilization of the machine, people of the 20th century have suddenly realized the true stage of its development: this step is no higher than that which our ancestors were at in the days of Attila and Genghis Khan. It is infinitely sad to know that two thousand years of Christianity have passed almost without a trace upon the people.".

In October, Bulgakov continued circulating the appeal, collecting signatures and posting copies which were confiscated by the Tsarist secret police, or Okhrana. On October 28 Bulgakov was arrested together with 27 signatories of the appeal.
In November and December 1915, most defendants were released from custody on bail. A trial took place on April 1, 1916 and the defendants were acquitted.

As Russia's involvement in the war continued anyway, soldiers began to establish their own revolutionary tribunals and began to execute officers en masse. After the October Revolution of 1917, Lenin's Bolsheviks called for unilateral armistice, but the other combatants refused, determined to fight until the bitter end. The Bolsheviks agreed a peace treaty with Imperial Germany, the Treaty of Brest-Litovsk, despite its harsh conditions. They also published the secret treaties between Russia and the Western Allies, hoping that the revelation of Allied plans for a vengeful peace would encourage international opposition to the war.

France
In 1917, a series of mutinies in the French army led to dozens of soldiers being executed and many more imprisoned. These soldiers were rehabilitated by the French government in the 1990s.

United States

Henry Ford

Industrialist Henry Ford believed that capitalism could conquer war so he organized and funded a major effort of antiwar leaders traveling to Europe in 1915 to talk to diplomats in major countries about the need for prosperity and peace. Ford chartered an ocean liner and invited prominent peace activists to join him. He hoped to create enough publicity to prompt the belligerent nations to convene a peace conference and mediate an end to the war,  but the mission was widely mocked by the press, which referred to the liner as the “Ship of Fools” as well as the “Peace Ship”. Infighting between the activists, mockery by the press contingent aboard, and an outbreak of influenza marred the voyage. Four days after Oscar II arrived in Norway, a beleaguered and physically ill Ford abandoned the mission and returned to the United States. The peace mission was unsuccessful, which reinforced Ford’s reputation as a supporter of unusual causes.

Religious groups
Leaders of most religious groups (except the Episcopalians)  were pacifists, as were leaders of the women's movement. A concerted effort was made by anti-war leaders, including Jane Addams, Oswald Garrison Villard, David Starr Jordan, Henry Ford, Lillian Wald, and Carrie Chapman Catt. Their goal was to convince President Wilson to mediate an end of the war by bringing the belligerents to the conference table. Wilson indeed made an energetic, sustained and serious effort to do so, and kept his administration neutral, but he was repeatedly rebuffed by Britain and Germany. Finally in 1917 Wilson convinced some of them that to be truly anti-war they needed to support what Wilson promised would be "a war to end all wars".

Once war was declared, the more liberal denominations, which had influenced the Social Gospel, called for a war for righteousness that would help uplift all mankind. The theme—an aspect of American exceptionalism—was that God had chosen America as his tool to bring redemption to the world.

Far-left

Leading up to 1917 and the declaration of war against Germany, the labor unions, socialists, members of the Old Right, and pacifist groups in the United States publicly denounced participation, the obvious motive for the 1916 Preparedness Day Bombing stemming from this. When Woodrow Wilson ran for reelection in 1916 on the slogan "He Kept Us Out of War", he received support from these groups (although the Socialist Party of America ran its own candidate, Allan Benson). After Wilson was reelected, though, events quickly spiraled into war. The Zimmermann Telegram and resumption of unrestricted submarine warfare by Germany provoked outrage in the U.S., and Congress declared war on April 6. Conscription was introduced shortly thereafter, which the anti-war movement bitterly opposed. Many socialists, typified by Walter Lippmann, became enthusiastic supporters of the war. So too did Samuel Gompers and the great majority of organized labor unions. However, the IWW --"Wobblies"—gained strength by opposing the war.

The Espionage Act of 1917 was passed to prevent spying but also contained a section which criminalized inciting or attempting to incite any mutiny, desertion, or refusal of duty in the armed forces, punishable with a fine of not more than $10,000, not more than twenty years in federal prison, or both. Thousands of Wobblies and anti-war activists were prosecuted on authority of this and the Sedition Act of 1918, which tightened restrictions even more. Among the most famous was Eugene Debs, chairman of the Socialist Party of the USA for giving an anti-draft speech in Ohio. The U.S. Supreme Court upheld these prosecutions in a series of decisions.

Conscientious objectors were punished as well, most of them Christian pacifist inductees. They were placed directly in the armed forces and court-martialed, receiving draconian sentences and harsh treatment. A number of them died in Alcatraz Prison, then a military facility. Vigilante groups were formed which suppressed dissent as well, such as by rounding up draft-age men and checking if they were in possession of draft cards or not.

Ben Salmon was a Catholic conscientious objector and outspoken critic of Just War theology. During World War I, America's Roman Catholic hierarchy denounced him and The New York Times described him as a "spy suspect." The US military (in which he was never inducted) court-martialed him for desertion and spreading propaganda, then sentenced him to death (this was later revised to 25 years hard labor).

Around 300,000 American men evaded or refused conscription in World War I. Aliens such as Emma Goldman were deported, while naturalized or even native-born citizens, including Eugene Debs, lost their citizenship for their activities. Helen Keller, a socialist, and Jane Addams, a pacifist, also publicly opposed the war, but neither was prosecuted, likely because they were sympathetic figures (Keller working to help fellow deaf-blind people and Addams in charity to benefit the poor).

In 1919, as the soldiers came home, disturbances continued, with veterans fighting strikers, the Seattle General Strike, race riots in the South and the Palmer Raids following two anarchist bombings. After the election of Warren G. Harding in 1920, Americans were eager to follow his campaign slogan of "Return to Normalcy." Anti-war dissidents in federal prison, such as Debs, and conscientious objectors, had their sentences commuted to time served or were pardoned on December 25, 1921. The Sedition Act was repealed in 1921, but the Espionage Act remains, and Richard Nixon attempted to invoke it in vain to prevent the Pentagon Papers being published in 1971. Many U.S. Supreme Court decisions since then have substantially, but not explicitly, gutted the provisions used to squelch dissent.

In the African colonies
In many European colonies in Africa, the recruitment of the indigenous population to serve in the army or as porters met widespread opposition and resistance. In British Nyasaland (modern-day Malawi), the recruitment of Nyasa to serve in the East Africa Campaign contributed to the Chilembwe uprising in 1915.

See also
 Recruitment to the British Army during the First World War
 British propaganda during World War I
 Dulce et Decorum est
 Home front during World War I
 Italian propaganda during World War I
 List of anti-war organizations
 List of peace activists
 Opposition to World War II
 Spirit of 1914
 Zimmerwald Conference

References

Further reading
 Chatfield, Charles. For peace and justice: pacifism in America, 1914-1941 (University of Tennessee Press, 1971).
 Damousi, Joy. "Socialist women and gendered space: the anti/conscription and anti/war campaigns of 1914/1918." Labour History 60 (1991): 1-15. online
 Duncan, Robert. Objectors & resisters: opposition to conscription and war in Scotland 1914-18 (2015) isbn=978-09930965-1-8
 Early, Frances. A world without war: How US feminists and pacifists resisted World War I (Syracuse University Press, 1997) online.
 Grimshaw, Sabine. "The Responsibility of Women: Women’s Anti-War Writing in the Press, 1914–16." in Women’s Writing of the First World War (Routledge, 2019) pp. 78-90.
 Hostetter, Richard. "The SPD and the General Strike as an Anti‐war Weapon, 1905‐1914." The Historian 13.1 (1950): 27-51.

 Jarausch, Konrad H. "Armageddon Revisited: Peace Research Perspectives on World War One." Peace & Change 7.1‐2 (1981): 109-118.
 Jordens, Ann‐Mari. "Anti‐war organisations in a society at war, 1914–18." Journal of Australian Studies 14.26 (1990): 78-93.
 Kazin, Michael. War against War: The American Fight for Peace, 1914–1918 (2017). 
 Kelly, Andrew. "Film as Antiwar Propaganda: Lay Down Your Arms (1914)." Peace & Change 16.1 (1991): 97-112.

 Kennedy, Kathleen. "Declaring war on war: Gender and the American socialist attack on militarism, 1914-1918." Journal of Women's History 7.2 (1995): 27-51. excerpt
 McKillen, Elizabeth. "Pacifist Brawn and Silk‐Stocking Militarism: Labor, Gender, and Antiwar Politics, 1914–1918." Peace & Change 33.3 (2008): 388-425. 
 Melancon, Michael S. The Socialist Revolutionaries and the Russian Anti-War Movement, 1914-1917 (Ohio State University Press, 1990).
 Moorehead, Caroline. Troublesome People: The Warriors of Pacifism (1987) covers Britain 1914 to 1945. 
 Patterson,  David S. The Search for Negotiated Peace: Women's Activism and Citizen Diplomacy in World War I (Routledge, 2008).

 Steigerwald, Alison Rebecca. "Women United Against War: American Female Peace Activists’ Work During the First World War, 1914-1917' (PhD dissertation, The University of Iowa, 2020) online
 Tylee, Claire M. "'Maleness run riot'—The great war and women's resistance to militarism." Women's Studies International Forum 11#3 (1988) online

 Wachtell, Cynthia. War No More: The Antiwar Impulse in American Literature, 1861–1914 (Louisiana State University Press, 2010).
 Weinroth, Howard. "Peace by Negotiation and the British Anti-War Movement, 1914-1918." Canadian Journal of History 10.3 (1975): 369-392.     
 Wiltsher, Anne.  Most Dangerous Women: Feminist Peace Campaigners of the Great War. (Routledge, 1985).

 Zeiger, Susan. "The schoolhouse vs. the armory: US teachers and the campaign against militarism in the schools, 1914-1918." Journal of Women's History 15.2 (2003): 150-179. online

External links 
 Patterson, David S.: Pacifism , in: 1914-1918-online. International Encyclopedia of the First World War.
 Wilmers, Annika: Feminist Pacifism , in: 1914-1918-online. International Encyclopedia of the First World War.
 Marcobelli, Elisa: Pre-war Socialist Pacifism , in: 1914-1918-online. International Encyclopedia of the First World War.

 
Anti-war movement
Politics of World War I